Tom Clancy's Ghost Recon Advanced Warfighter 2 (GRAW 2) is a tactical shooter video game developed by Ubisoft Paris and Red Storm Entertainment and published by Ubisoft. It was released for Xbox 360, Microsoft Windows, PlayStation 3 and PlayStation Portable. It is the sequel to Tom Clancy's Ghost Recon Advanced Warfighter. High Voltage Software developed the game's PlayStation Portable version, while Grin developed the PC version.

The game takes place in 2014, immediately after the events of Tom Clancy's Ghost Recon Advanced Warfighter (GRAW), just south of the Mexico–United States border, and focuses on the conflict between a Mexican rebel group, Mexican loyalists, and the U.S. Army in the span of 72 hours. A wide array of location types are included, featuring mountains, small towns, urban environments, and a large hydro-electric dam.

Gameplay
Much of the gameplay remains similar to its predecessor; the combat focuses on the player doing the bulk of the fighting, while relying on tactical combat instead of arcade-style shooting to overcome opponents. As with the previous game, weapons featured in the game are either based on actual models (such as the FN SCAR) or are hypothetical prototypes, with the player able to command friendly units assigned to help them, from their own squad, to drones, tanks and aircraft. Like its predecessor, two different versions exist; while both the Xbox 360 and Playstation 3 versions are essentially similar, the Microsoft Windows version features many gameplay differences to these versions. In addition, a new and improved gameplay element is introduced - Crosscom 2.0 - as well as new weapons (including sub-machine guns for secondary weapons), the ability to have a medic in the squad, and new friendly units to control, including a two-man squad of Loyalist troops, the MULE Drone, a Little Bird attack helicopter, and Far Support (Airstrikes for consoles, Mortar/Artillery Support for Microsoft Windows).

Crosscom 2.0
Crosscom 2.0 is an improvement on the original system introduced from the previous game, giving players more direct involvement in a combat situation as well as more control over friendly units. The most significant improvement to this is an information interlink between all friendly units, which now allows players to get a full screen view of what any unit is seeing. Furthermore, players can use this perspective to plan out orders for units and even directly control the movement of some units as well, such as the MULE.

Xbox 360 and PlayStation 3 versions
Much of the gameplay is similar to that of the Xbox 360 version of GRAW, although some new features, like Eternal Eyes, have been added to improve gameplay, making the direction of friendly units more accurate and effective. The squad A.I. has also been improved, with squad members actively seeking cover and descriptively calling out targets.

Microsoft Windows version
Much of the gameplay plays out differently to that of the console iterations, and more similarly to the original Tom Clancy's Ghost Recon, but remains largely similar to the Microsoft Windows version of GRAW, in that players play in a first-person perspective, must micro-manage team mates with greater use of squad tactics, and have more situation awareness. Developed by Grin and built on their proprietary engine called "Diesel 2.0", only a few in-game assets such as voice-overs and Cross-Com and Narcom videos remain the same. While some of the missions featured are similar in objective structure to those of the console version, they play out in a completely different manner.

Multiplayer
Unlike the first GRAW, players in the online multiplayer mode can be "downed", or critically injured, instead of killed. This gives teammates the opportunity to heal a downed teammate and prevent the other team from getting the point, although downed players can be shot and killed by players from the opposing team before they are healed. Characters can now "slide" into a crouched position while running, just like in the first GRAW. The ability to use cover like in the singleplayer mode is absent in the multiplayer mode. The player can choose from four weapon classes: Rifleman, Grenadier, Automatic Rifleman, and Marksman, each with its own bonus; for example choosing the rifleman class makes the player more proficient with rifles, the automatic rifleman more proficient with machine guns, and so on. Another new feature added to multiplayer is full-screen cross-com; as in singleplayer mode, the player can hold down a button and bring up the fullscreen view. This can be used to view friendly players' views as well as the Drone, but cannot be used to give commands or manually fly the drone.

Games are created by Xbox Live and PlayStation Network users and can be up to 16 players. Split Screen is available on the console versions, which supports up to four players.

Story
Despite the death of Carlos Ontiveros following his coup in Mexico City, rebellion across Mexico continues unabated, and civil unrest spreads further into Latin American countries, shutting the Panama Canal down due to insurgency. Captain Scott Mitchell and his Ghost team are given orders to return to Mexico and continue opposing the rebellion, which has reached the Mexican state of Chihuahua and the border city of Ciudad Juárez. General Joshua Keating informs Mitchell that apart from preventing an attack on U.S. soil, he must also investigate intel that suggests that the new rebel leader, Juan de la Barrera, is in possession of a dirty bomb. Keating further adds that due to Congress not wishing to take military action, in addition to current international treaties between Mexico and the U.S., the Ghosts are officially not allowed to operate across the border and thus cannot be provided much support until America can legally enter the conflict.

Arriving in the mountains outside of Ciudad Juárez, Mitchell begins assisting loyalist Mexican Army soldiers, led by Colonel Jimenez, in attacking rebel positions. During the fighting, Keating and Lieutenant Barnes reveal that de la Barrera is in possession of three stolen Ukrainian Red Star IV nuclear warheads, and plans to combine them with stolen Pakistani-built Kashmira-II missiles, taken from cargo ships in the Panama Canal, to use against the United States. Mitchell continues assisting Jimenez, eventually helping him to secure a heavily defended supermarket. Immediately after securing the area, one of the warheads detonates in the supermarket's basement, killing Jimenez's men and irradiating the area.

With the warheads now confirmed to be in Juárez, Keating orders Mitchell to assist the rest of Jimenez's forces in extracting a Mexican journalist who, in exchange for safe passage out of the city, agrees to supply the Americans with intel on de la Barrera, and where he is hiding the other warheads. Though the Ghosts successfully extract the journalist, their transport, Blackhawk 5, is shot down by mercenaries assisting the rebels, and they are forced to abandon Lieutenant Rosen. Despite heavy opposition, the team eventually receive ground extraction from the area, but are eventually ambushed by the rebels; with the assistance of loyalist forces, Mitchell manages to regain contact with Keating, and is extracted by Blackhawk 9. Soon after being extracted, Barnes reveals that the rebels managed to secure Blackhawk 5's crash site before they could, removing both the wreckage and an injured Rosen, in order to manipulate the media and expose America's illegal involvement against the rebellion, thus gaining support for their cause. Keating sends the Ghosts to a heavily secured hacienda to prevent this, whereupon Mitchell and his team successfully destroy the wreckage and recover Rosen.

Shortly after leaving the hacienda, Mitchell receives word from Keating that U.S. President Ballantine and Mexican President Ruiz-Peña have signed the North American Joint Security Agreement, effectively allowing the United States to intervene in Mexico. The Ghosts use the rescued journalist's information to begin tracking down the two missing warheads, killing de la Barrera in the process, but only manage to neutralize one. Intelligence eventually reveals that the mercenaries have launched an attack on a dam within El Paso, Texas, prompting fears that the warhead will be detonated on U.S. soil. However, Barnes reveals that the true target was a highly classified military installation beneath the dam that is connected to the United States anti-ballistic missile defense grid. Keating surmises that by dropping the grid, de la Barrera intended to nuke major American cities in the hopes of forcing them out of Latin America.

President Ballantine, unwilling to destroy El Paso and Juárez to prevent the attacks, asks Mitchell to find the last warhead and neutralize it. With heavy support, the Ghosts head back into Mexico and track down the launch site for the last warhead. Mitchell then guides an EMP strike, which successfully neutralizes the last nuke, but seriously wounds him in the process. Mitchell is then recovered by Rosen, while Keating and Ballantine congratulate him for his efforts.

Reception

Reviews of the game were favorable upon release, although the Windows version of the game got lower scores than the console versions.  GameRankings and Metacritic gave it a score of 86.59% and 84 out of 100 for the PlayStation 3 version; 86.46% and 86 out of 100 for the Xbox 360 version; 77.15% and 76 out of 100 for the PC version; and 62.38% and 61 out of 100 for the PSP version.

As of April 26, 2007, Tom Clancy's Ghost Recon Advanced Warfighter 2 has sold 1 million copies on the Xbox 360. It was also named Game of the Month by Game Informer for May 2007.

Controversy
Controversy surrounded the game when the Mayor of Ciudad Juárez, Héctor Murguía Lardizábal, criticized the game for trying to scare tourists away from going to the town. Chihuahua's governor José Reyes condemned the game for insulting Mexico and its people, calling on all authorities to seize the game if it were sold on Mexican soil.

References

External links
 
 

2007 video games
Diesel (game engine) games
Grin (company) games
High Voltage Software games
Multiplayer and single-player video games
PlayStation 3 games
PlayStation Portable games
Third-person shooters
Tom Clancy games
 04
Ubisoft games
Video games developed in France
Video games developed in Sweden
Video games developed in the United States
Video games scored by Tom Salta
Video games set in 2013
Video games set in Mexico
Video games set in Texas
Video games using PhysX
Windows games
Xbox 360 games
Video games using Havok
Red Storm Entertainment games